This is an incomplete list of the paintings by the French painter Paul Cézanne. The artistic career of Cézanne spanned more than forty years, from roughly 1860 to 1906, and formed a bridge between Impressionism and Post-Impressionism. Cézanne was one of a trio with Vincent van Gogh and Paul Gauguin that were underappreciated in their time but who would have an incalculable effect on the art of the twentieth century, providing an inspiration for artists such as Pablo Picasso and Henri Matisse. Picasso would go so far as to call Cézanne "The father of us all".

A prolific artist, he produced more than 900 oil paintings and 400 watercolours, including many incomplete works. The first complete catalogue of his work was authored by Lionello Venturi in 1936. Further catalogues were produced by John Rewald and an online catalogue by Walter Feilchenfeldt, David Nash and Jayne Warman.

Paintings 1859–1870

Paintings 1871–1878

Paintings 1878–1890

Paintings 1890–1906

See also
 The Negro Scipion (1867)
 The Overture to Tannhäuser (1869)
 L'Estaque, Melting Snow (c. 1871)
 The Hanged Man's House (1873)
 L'Après-midi à Naples (c. 1876)
 The Eternal Feminine (c. 1877)
 View of Auvers-sur-Oise (1879–80)
 Three Bathers (1879-1882) 
 Portrait of Louis Guillaume (1879–1882)
 Mont Sainte-Victoire and the Viaduct of the Arc River Valley (1882–1885)
 Mont Sainte-Victoire seen from Bellevue (1885)
 House in Provence (1885)
 Mont Sainte-Victoire with Large Pine (c. 1887)
 Portrait of Madame Cézanne with Loosened Hair (1883–1887)
 View of the Domaine Saint-Joseph (late 1880s)
 The Basket of Apples (c. 1893)
 Rideau, Cruchon et Compotier (1893–1894)
 The Boy in the Red Vest (1894–1895)
 Portrait of Gustave Geffroy (1895)
 Seated Peasant (c. 1892-1896)
 Portrait of Ambroise Vollard (1899)
 Women Bathing (c. 1900)
 Lady in Blue (c. 1900)
 Pyramid of Skulls (1901)
 Forest (1902–1904)
 The Bathers (1898–1905)
 Still Life with Teapot (1902–1906)
 La Montagne Sainte-Victoire vue du bosquet du Château Noir (1904)
 The Card Players (Series, 1890–1895)
 Mont Sainte-Victoire (Series, 1904-1906)

References

External links
 Online Catalogue raisonné

Cezanne